The 2017–18 Bulgarian Basketball Cup was the 64th edition of the annual cup tournament in Bulgaria.It is managed by the Bulgarian Basketball Federation.The competition started on November 22, 2017, and ended with the Final on March 3, 2018. Rilski Sportist won their second cup. Yordan Bozov was named Final MVP.

Format
In this edition, the Bulgarian Basketball Federation presented new format. In the first round, the six teams who participated in European or Regional competitions from the NBL have an automatic bye to the quarterfinals, while the other three teams and five teams from A Group League (second tier) would play a single-game eliminatory for a place in the quarterfinals. Teams with lower league position will have home advantage. The quarterfinals and semifinals are played in a double-legged format.

Participating clubs

Bracket

Source: Basketball.bg

First round
The game between Vidabasket and BUBA was canceled , because Vidabasket withdrew the tournament (the club was in the initial draw). That gave an automatic bye to the next round to BUBA.

Second round
Teams in same division will play in a double-legged format.

Quarterfinals

Semifinals

Final

References

Bulgarian Basketball Cup
Cup